Hortus Kewensis, or a Catalogue of the Plants Cultivated in the Royal Botanic Garden at Kew by William Aiton was a 1789 catalogue of all the plant species then in cultivation at the Royal Botanic Gardens, Kew, which constituted the vast majority of plant species in cultivation in all of England. It included information on the country of origin, who introduced the plant into English cultivation, and when. It is therefore now one of the most important sources of information on history of horticulture in England.

A second edition was published between 1810 and 1813; the bulk of the new information was added by Aiton's son William Townsend Aiton. In reference work, this is given the abbreviation Ait. Kew.

References

Bibliography

 
 
 
 Volume I
 Volume II
 Volume III
 
 Volume I
 Volume II
 Volume III
 Volume IV
 Volume V

External links 
 

Royal Botanic Gardens, Kew
Botany books
Botany in Europe
1780s in science
1789 non-fiction books
1810 non-fiction books